Cirricaecula macdowelli is an eel in the family Ophichthidae (worm/snake eels). It was described by John E. McCosker and John Ernest Randall in 1993. It is a subtropical, marine eel which is known from Taiwan, in the northwestern Pacific Ocean. Males can reach a maximum total length of 22.8 centimetres.

Etymology
The fish is named in honor of Michael McDowell, an Australian tour operator, who has taken the describers to remote outposts in search of rare specimens.

References

Ophichthidae
Taxa named by John E. McCosker
Taxa named by John Ernest Randall
Fish described in 1993